Chillenden windmill is a grade II* listed open-trestle post mill north of Chillenden, Kent, England. It is the last post mill built in Kent.

History
Chillenden windmill was built by Holman's of Canterbury in 1868, replacing an earlier post mill that had blown down. The new mill incorporated some material from the old one. A windmill was marked on Philip Symonson's map of 1596, John Speed's map of 1611, Robert Morden's map of 1695, Emanuel Bowen's map of 1736, Andrews, Drury and Herbert's map of 1769 and all Ordnance Survey maps from 1819. Holman's, the Canterbury millwrights, fitted a new stock and two new sails in 1927, and the mill was working until 1949, when it lost a sail in a gale. Local people raised some money in 1955 to make the mill weatherproof, and on 12 December 1957 the mill was bought for £100,  by Kent County Council and restored at a cost of £728 although some machinery was removed.

Collapse and rebuilding
Chillenden windmill collapsed on 26 November 2003. The collapse was attributed to the fact that one of the four piers on which the mill stood had sunk into the ground over time, and the mill's being in a fixed position, not facing directly into the prevailing wind at the time. The mill wreckage was carefully dismantled on 15 December 2003 and put into storage while a decision was made on the future of the building. There were rumours that the mill would be rebuilt at the Museum of Kent Life, but on 31 March 2004 Kent County Council announced that the mill was to be rebuilt on site. The restoration work was carried out by IJP Millwrights, of Binfield Heath, Berkshire. The work included new crosstrees and quarterbars, a new windshaft, both breast and tail of the mill rebuilt and new weatherboarding all over. Four new sails were made, replacing those on the mill at the time of its collapse. These had been fitted in 2001. By early May 2005, work had commenced on site re-erecting the frame of the mill. The reconstructed frame of the mill was erected on the new trestle on 25 May 2005. The mill reopened to visitors on 13 September 2005.

Description

Chillenden windmill is a white open-trestle post mill with four spring sails carried on a cast-iron windshaft. The windshaft carries a cast-iron brake wheel with a wooden rim. The brake wheel has fifty wooden cogs, driving a cast-iron wallower on a cast-iron upright shaft. This carries a cast-iron great spur wheel which drives two pairs of underdrift millstones in the head of the mill. The mill formerly had a maize kibbler, but this was removed when the mill was restored in 1958. The mill is winded by a tailpole.

Gallery

Millers
Haywood & Cage
William Hopper Bean, 1882–99
A Laker, 1930
N W Laker, 1949

See also
 Cobstone Windmill
 List of windmills in Kent

References

External links
Chillenden Windmill - Dover District Council 
IJP Millwrights
Windmill World page on the mill.
Gallery of images of collapsed mill

Windmills in Kent
Grinding mills in the United Kingdom
Tourist attractions in Kent
Post mills in the United Kingdom
Windmills completed in 2005
Grade II* listed buildings in Kent
Museums in Dover District
Mill museums in England